The Button-Down Mind Strikes Back is a 1960 stand-up comedy album by Bob Newhart. Released soon after Newhart's top-selling debut The Button-Down Mind of Bob Newhart, the sequel album reached #1 on the Billboard Monophonic Action Albums chart on January 9, 1961. The two albums would occupy the top two positions on the chart for almost 30 weeks. Propelled by the success of Newhart's first album, The Button-Down Mind Strikes Back had sold 150,000 advance copies at the time of its release.

The album's tracks were recorded at the hungry i in San Francisco and Freddie's in Minneapolis.

Track listing 

 "Automation and a Private in Washington's Army" – 5:10
 "The Grace L. Ferguson Airline (And Storm Door Co.)" – 9:30
 "Bus Drivers School" – 6:13
 "Retirement Party" – 8:08
 "An Infinite Number of Monkeys" – 1:33
 "Ledge Psychology" – 5:10

References 

1960 live albums
Bob Newhart live albums
Warner Records live albums
Stand-up comedy albums